Kizhinga (Buryat and ) is a rural locality (a selo) and the administrative center of Kizhinginsky District of the Republic of Buryatia, Russia. Population:

References

Notes

Sources

Rural localities in Kizhinginsky District
1915 establishments in the Russian Empire